Trachypepla is a genus of moths of the family Oecophoridae. It was circumscribed in 1883 by Edward Meyrick. The species within this genus are indigenous to Australia and New Zealand.

It consists of the following species:

References

Oecophoridae
Taxa named by Edward Meyrick